Show Some Emotion is the fourth studio album by British singer-songwriter Joan Armatrading, released in 1977 on A&M. It reached No. 6 on the UK Albums Chart, No. 52 on the US Billboard 200 albums chart, and No. 18 on the Australian Kent Music Report albums chart.

Armatrading's 1979 live album Steppin' Out contains two tracks from Show Some Emotion, "Mama Mercy" and "Kissin' and a Huggin'".

Reception

In a review for AllMusic, Dave Connolly wrote that he did not enjoy the album as much as her previous self-titled album, declaring that much of it was "like outtakes from that effort". He criticised the lyrics and arrangements, as well as the track placement. However, he praised "Show Some Emotion" and "Willow" as highlights. Robert Christgau, on the other hand, called Armatrading "sometimes funny, always real, and never ever pretentious", but wrote that "most of the meaning of the ordinary-plus lyrics is conveyed by stance and nuance". Trouser Press called Show Some Emotion a "lovely ... casual-sounding album of songs that, if not among her best, are more than presentable and occasionally captivating". The Washington Post wrote that "Armatrading combines influences from her native West Indies and adopted England, and her voice projects both tenderness and power".

Track listing
All tracks composed by Joan Armatrading.

Side One
"Woncha Come on Home"  – 2:40
"Show Some Emotion"  – 3:31
"Warm Love"  – 3:04
"Never Is Too Late"  – 5:32
"Peace in Mind"  – 3:19

Side Two
"Opportunity"  – 3:25
"Mama Mercy"  – 2:47
"Get in the Sun"  – 3:19
"Willow"  – 4:53
"Kissin' and a Huggin'"  – 4:42

Personnel

 Joan Armatrading – lead vocals, acoustic guitar; thumb piano (mbira) on "Woncha Come on Home"
 Jerry Donahue – electric guitar; slide guitar on "Opportunity"
 Bryan Garofalo – bass guitar
 Dave Markee – bass
 Georgie Fame – Fender Rhodes electric piano
 John "Rabbit" Bundrick – Hammond organ
 Tim Hinkley – Hammond organ on "Peace in Mind", piano on "Kissin' and a Huggin'"
 Mel Collins – saxophone on "Mama Mercy" and "Kissin' and a Huggin'"
 David Kemper – drums
 Kenney Jones – drums on "Opportunity"
 Henry Spinetti – drums on "Warm Love" and "Kissin' and a Huggin'"
 Joe Scott – background vocals on "Opportunity" and "Get in the Sun"
 Pete Clarke – background vocals on "Opportunity" and "Get in the Sun"
 Brian Rogers – string arrangement and conductor on "Warm Love"

Technical
 Glyn Johns – producer, engineer
 Jon Astley – assistant engineer
 Fabio Nicoli – art direction
 Nick Marshall – design
 David Montgomery – sleeve photography

References

1977 albums
Joan Armatrading albums
Albums produced by Glyn Johns
Albums recorded at Olympic Sound Studios
A&M Records albums